Montgomery Regional Airport  (Dannelly Field) is a civil-military airport seven miles southwest of Montgomery, the capital of Alabama. Owned by the Montgomery Airport Authority, it is used for general aviation and military aviation, and sees two airlines.

The Federal Aviation Administration (FAA) National Plan of Integrated Airport Systems for 2017–2021 categorized it as a non-hub primary commercial service facility.
Federal Aviation Administration records say the airport had 157,958 enplanements in calendar year 2013, a decrease from 182,313 in 2012.

History
Commercial aviation and military aviation have been intertwined in Montgomery. The first commercial air services in Montgomery operated at Maxwell Field, a military facility founded by the Wright Brothers west of the city. To provide for commercial aviation the City of Montgomery opened its original municipal airport in 1929 east of the city. This facility was later named Gunter Field and was served by a predecessor of American Airlines. Eastern Air Lines subsequently took over service at Gunter.

In 1940 the War Department chose Gunter Field for a new pilot training facility. Gunter quickly became congested, Eastern Airlines was forced to move temporarily to Maxwell, and the city purchased a tract southwest of downtown on US 80 to replace Gunter for civilian aviation. Separately, the Army Air Forces identified a need for seven auxiliary fields in the vicinity of Gunter and the city and USAAF agreed that the city's newly purchased site would also serve as Gunter's auxiliary field #6. It opened in 1943 and was named for ENS Clarence Moore Dannelly Jr., USN, a Navy pilot killed in a 1940 training accident and considered to be the first casualty of World War II from Montgomery. The old Army Air Forces hangars are now part of the Montgomery Aviation complex. The original three runways and their original dimensions were:
 3/21: .  Still exists.
 9/27: . Redesignated 10/28 in 1992.
 15/33: .  Closed in 1981.  Some portions remain as taxiway and apron.

When Dannelly Field opened, Eastern moved its operations there. The city took title to Dannelly in 1946, although joint commercial and military use continued, and erected a permanent passenger terminal and control tower north of Runway 9/27 in 1955. While Runway 9/27 was being rebuilt in 1963, and again in 1970, commercial flights were temporarily diverted to Maxwell AFB.

Military use
The Alabama Air National Guard's 187th Fighter Wing (187 FW), based on the west side of the airport at Montgomery Air National Guard Base, operates a squadron ofF-16C aircraft. The 187th Fighter Wing evolved from the 160th Tactical Reconnaissance Squadron that began operating at Dannelly Field in 1953.  During its history, the 187th and its predecessor have based several types of aircraft at Montgomery, including the RF-51 Mustang, RF-80 Shooting Star, RF-84 Thunderflash, RF-4 Phantom II, F-4 Phantom II and C-131 Samaritan.

The Alabama Army National Guard also has an Army Aviation Support Facility on the south side of the airport.  Although primarily oriented to helicopter operations, fixed-wing aircraft can also be accommodated. The 31st Aviation Battalion was established here in 1986 and became the 1st Battalion, 131st Aviation Regiment a year later.

An Air National Guard Aircraft Rescue and Fire Fighting (ARFF) unit is located at the airport, equipped with multiple fire fighting and rescue vehicles, to augment the airport's civilian ARFF unit.

Facilities

Montgomery Regional Airport covers 1,907 acres (772 ha) at an elevation of 221 feet (67 m). It has two asphalt runways. Runway 10/28 is 9,020 by 150 feet (2,749 x 46 m) and had CAT I ILS and approach lights on both ends. Runway 3/21 is 4,011 by 150 feet (1,223 x 46 m). It has one asphalt helipad, 100 by 100 feet (30 x 30 m).

The airline terminal has been expanded and modified several times since 1955. A $40 million capital program that finished in November 2006 doubled the size of the terminal, transformed its appearance, and modernized it with second-floor boarding, passenger loading bridges, and a rotunda with a domed ceiling that simulates sunrises, sunsets, and stars at night.

The apron and the main runway and taxiways can accommodate aircraft as large as the Boeing 747 and Antonov 124. Some college football teams visiting Auburn University charter larger aircraft into Montgomery.

There are numerous corporate aviation hangars and support facilities. A new control tower was built in 1996 south of Runway 10/28.

In 2017 the airport had 71,431 aircraft operations, average 199 per day: 48% military, 39% general aviation, 11% air taxi, and 2% airline. In May 2018, 125 aircraft were based at this airport: 46 military, 52 single-engine, 16 multi-engine, 9 jet, and 2 helicopter.

Airlines and destinations

Airlines with scheduled nonstop flights to:

Statistics

Top destinations

Other statistics

Former airlines and flights
Past airlines since 1943 have included Eastern Air Lines, Eastern Metro Express, Waterman Airlines, Southern Airways, Republic Airlines, Piedmont Aviation, Sun Airlines, Southeast Commuter Airlines, South Central Air Transport (SCAT), Air Illinois, Trans Air Express, Ocean Airways, Continental Airlines, Continental Express, Northwest Airlink, US Airways Express, and Via Airlines. 50-90 passenger regional jets are now the usual airliners, but in the past airlines such as Delta scheduled the DC-9, MD-80, 737, 727, and even the DC-8.

Northwest Airlink flew to Memphis until it merged with Delta; Delta retired the route a year and a half after acquiring Northwest. Continental Express flew nonstop to Houston Intercontinental. Past Delta routes include flights to New Orleans, Jackson, Cincinnati and Dallas. Eastern flights were to Atlanta, Birmingham, Dothan, Mobile, and Pensacola. Southern/Republic flights were to Birmingham, Dothan, Panama City, Orlando, Tallahassee, and Memphis.

Prior to the merger with American in October 2015, US Airways Express flew direct to Charlotte three times daily. American Eagle continued the route after the merger.

Via Airlines flew nonstop to Orlando-Sanford from May 2018 to May 2019.

Master plan
The 20-year, $98 million master plan projects enplanements to reach 245,000 a year in 2030. The plan calls for runway 3/21 to be doubled in length to 8,000 ft, and with the extension commercial airlines will be able to use it. The plan also calls for new corporate hangars.

Accidents and incidents
On February 19, 2021, a military airplane crashed in a wooded area near the airport, killing two people.
On December 31, 2022, a ground worker was killed after she was ingested by a jet engine of an American Eagle Airlines Embraer 175

Images

References

Other sources

 Wesley Phillips Newton, "Origins and Early Development of Civil Aviation in Montgomery, 1910-1946," The Alabama Review, January 2004.

External links

 
 187th Fighter Wing, Alabama Air National Guard, official website
 
 

Transportation in Montgomery, Alabama
Buildings and structures in Montgomery, Alabama
Airports in Montgomery County, Alabama